Taicallimorpha is a genus of tiger moths in the family Erebidae. The genus is endemic in Taiwan and consists of only one species, Taicallimorpha albipuncta.

References
 Dubatolov, V.V. & Kishida, Y. (2006): On the re-arrangement of the East Asian Callimorpha species (Lepidoptera, Arctiidae). Tinea 19 (2): 111-125, Tokyo.

Callimorphina
Moths described in 1910
Monotypic moth genera
Moths of Asia